Kadiadara is a small village in the Indian state of Gujarat, near the city of Idar. Kadiadara is located about 46 km north east of Himatnagar and 25 km from Gujarat's border with Rajasthan.

References

Villages in Sabarkantha district